Puși Dinulescu (born Dumitru Dinulescu  (27 August 1942 – 1 August 2019) was a Romanian playwright, film, theatre and television director, novelist, and poet.

Biography
He was the son of the engineer Dumitru I. Dinulescu and Ileana Dinulescu (born Butunoiu), a housewife. He graduated the Letters at the University of Bucharest and Film and Television Direction at Institute of Theatre and Film Arts (IATC), Bucharest. Dinulescu made his debut in 1968, with Robert Calul (Robert the Horse), a collection of short stories. He also wrote novels, poetry and comedies.

He received The Bucharest Writers' Association Award (1979) for Linda Belinda (a collection of short stories) and The Writers' Union of Romania Award (1985), for his novel Îngerul contabil. He received in 2018 the Union Award for "long-standing eminent activity in dramaturgy" from the Union of the Romanian Writers, the Bucharest branch.

Dinulescu died in 2019 at Floreasca Hospital, of a heart attack. He is buried at Bellu Cemetery, in Bucharest.

Works
Short stories
1968: Robert Calul, Editura pentru literatură 
1979: Linda Belinda, Cartea Românească. The Bucharest Writers' Association Award
1982: Eu și Robert Calul (Robert Calul and Me), Eminescu
1982: Razrîv (Separation), I. Bogdan's Russian Translation of the short stories "At home", "The Atanasiu Family" and "Separation". 
2003: Crimă la circ (Murder in Circus), Meronia
2014: Lungul drum al prozei scurte (The long way of the short story), Tipo-Moldova, Iași
Novels
1980: Galaxia Burlacilor (Bachelors Galaxy), Cartea Românească
1985: Îngerul contabil (Accounting Angel), Cartea Românească. The Writers' Union of Romania Award. Second ed. 1998, Regis
2001: Romanul Sfintei Mogoșoaia (The Life and Times of Saint Mogoșoaia), Meronia
2009: Le vieux garçon, (French version of the novel Bachelors Galaxy signed Pouschy Dinulesco; translated by Michel Wattremez), Meronia
2010: Burlacul (The Bachelor), Minerva
Poetry
2002: Poezii bestiale (Awesome Poems)
2006: Frumoasa și lapovița (The Belle and the Sleet)
2015: Tandrețe tărăgănată (Jingling Tenderness), RBA Media
Plays
-first performed in TVR, National Theatre of Craiova, Robert Calul Theatre of Bucharest and in Pitești, Giurgiu, Bârlad and Turda.
Bani de dus, bani de-ntors (The old man who dearly paid his return fare)
Miere și venin (Honey and venom)
Casa cu țoape (House of the Uncouth)
Nunta lui Puiu (Puiu's Wedding)
Pescărușul lui Hamlet (The Hamlet's Seagull)
Senvici cu infinit (Boundless Sandwich)

-editions

2002: Două piese de teatru (Two plays), Meronia
2004: Pescărușul lui Hamlet (The Hamlet's Seagull), Palimpsest
2005: Nunta lui Puiu (Puiu's Wedding), Palimpsest
2010: Teatru (Theatre), Minerva
2013: La Boda de Puiu (Puiu's Wedding) – translated in Spanish by Juan Martinez, RBA Media
Polemical Works
2009: Gașca și diavolul (The Gang and The Devil), Minerva

Travels
2013: Călătoriile lui Nea Puși (Uncle Puși's Travels), Lider

Translations from Spanish
2014: Frederico Garcia Lorca Romancero gitano Editura Tribuna, Cluj-Napoca

Filmography
Director
1983: Întâlnirea din Pământuri (The Encounter of Pământuri)
1985: Sper să ne mai vedem (I hope to see you again) 
1998: Nuntă cu sirenă (Wedding with a siren) – TV Film
Screenwriter
1998: Nuntă cu sirenă – TV Film

References

General references:
Pop, Grigore Traian. Puși vs. Dumitru Dinulescu. București: Editura Crater, 2000. 
Popa, Marian. Dicționar de literatură română contemporană. București: Editura Albatros, 1971, ed. 2, 1977
Sasu, Aurel. Dicţionarul biografic al literaturii române. Pitești: Editura Paralela 45, 2004. 
Academia Română. Dicţionarul general al literaturii române. București: Editura Univers Enciclopedic  2004. 
Zaciu, Mircea; Papahagi, Marian; Sasu, Aurel. Dicţionarul esenţial al scriitorilor români. București: Editura Fundației Culturale  Romîne, 1998. 
Popa, Marian. Istoria literaturii române de azi pe mâine. București: Editura Semne, 2009. 
Negrici, Eugen. Literatura română sub comunism. Proza. București: Editura Fundației Pro, 2002: pp. 220–221

External links

1942 births
2019 deaths
University of Bucharest alumni
Caragiale National University of Theatre and Film alumni
Writers from Bucharest
Film people from Bucharest
Romanian dramatists and playwrights
Romanian novelists
Romanian male novelists
Romanian poets
Romanian male poets
Male dramatists and playwrights
Burials at Bellu Cemetery